George Howard Douglas Connor (born 1942) was the eighth bishop of the Anglican Diocese of Dunedin in Dunedin, New Zealand.

Connor was educated at St John's College, Auckland and ordained in 1966. He was a Theological Tutor for the Church of Melanesia and then a Maori Mission priest  for the Diocese of Waiapu. He was Archdeacon of Waiapu and then Regional Bishop in the Bay of Plenty. He was consecrated bishop 2 April 1989 and served the Bay of Plenty until 2005 when he was translated to Dunedin. He resigned his episcopal see on 30 November 2009.

He additionally served as Convening Bishop of Tikanga Pakeha (New Zealand dioceses), 1998–2006, and as such Co-Presiding Bishop of New Zealand, 2004–2006; in retirement, he has served as He Pīhopa Āwhina (an honorary assistant bishop) in Te Tai Tokerau since 2010. He is married to Nonie Connor.

References

External links
Saintly, Sinful or Secular 1814-1895 Viewed through the Lens of Te Māramataka 1895 and Its Historical Notes, by George Connor (2011)

1942 births
Living people
Anglican archdeacons in New Zealand
21st-century Anglican bishops in New Zealand
Anglican bishops of Dunedin